Joseph Coffey (born 22 May 1988) is a Scottish professional wrestler currently signed to WWE, performing in NXT. Coffey wrestles for numerous promotions in the British independent wrestling circuit, including Insane Championship Wrestling where he is former 2 time ICW World Heavyweight Champion and a former ICW Zero-G Champion. Coffey has also previously competed in Japan for Pro Wrestling ZERO1 where he became the first ever Scottish wrestler to perform in the Korakuen Hall. Coffey's younger brother Mark Coffey is also a professional wrestler and the pair often tag team together as "The Coffey Brothers".

Professional wrestling career

Insane Championship Wrestling (2011–2018)

On 6 February 2011 Coffey made his Insane Championship Wrestling (ICW) debut at The Notorious ICW, in a match where he teamed with Vinnie James in a defeat against The Bucky Boys (Davey Blaze and Stevie Xavier). On 3 April, at Nightmare on Renfrew Street Coffey was unsuccessful at winning the ICW Zero-G Championship in a Six-Way Championship Scramble match won by Noam Dar. On 6 May 2012 at Up In Smoke! Coffey teamed with his brother Mark Coffey to defeat Andy Wild and Noam Dar in the First Round match of the ICW Tag Team Championship tournament. On 1 July at Insane In The Membrane The Coffey Brothers were defeated in the Semi Final match of the tournament.

On 31 July 2016, Coffey defeated Big Damo to win the ICW World Heavyweight Championship, only for Wolfgang to cash in his Square Go contract to win the title. On 16 April 2017 at BarraMania 3, Coffey defeated Trent Seven to become the ICW World Heavyweight Champion for the second time. After the match he aligned himself with Red Lightning after attacking Mark Dallas, turning heel in the process. At Shug's Hoose Party 4, he retained the title against Jack Jester in a steel cage match. Coffey would have a number of successful title defences of the championship over the next few months against the likes of Jack Jester, Pete Dunne, NXT's Kassius Ohno, and others. At Fear and Loathing X at the SSE Hydro, in front of ICW's biggest crowd to date Joe lost the ICW World Heavyweight Championship against BT Gunn in his second consecutive main event of that event. The following day via Twitter, Joe announced his departure from ICW after 6 years.

On 29 April 2018 at Barramania 4, Joe returned to the company and challenged brother Mark to an ICW Zero-G Championship match at Shugs Hoose Party 5, which was later rescheduled for Fear and Loathing XI due to a clash with WWE NXT UK tapings. At Fear and Loathing XI, he defeated Mark to win the championship.

What Culture Pro Wrestling/Defiant Wrestling (2016–2018)

On the first episode of What Culture Pro Wrestling (WCPW) Coffey defeated Prince Ameen by count out. On the 9 November episode, Coffey teamed with his brother Mark Coffey to defeat Gabriel Kidd and Prince Ameen in the first round match of the WCPW Tag Team Championship tournament. The Coffey Brothers also defeated Pete Dunne and Travis Banks in the second round match, but they were defeated on 30 November at Delete WCPW by Johnny Moss and Liam Slater in the final round of the tournament.

At WCPW Loaded #24 Coffey and Travis Banks helped Joe Hendry defeat Alberto El Patron. At Exit Wounds, it was revealed that Coffey, Banks, Hendry, and BT Gunn had formed a stable called The Prestige. At WCPW Pro Wrestling World Cup in the Scottish Qualifying, Coffey defeated Liam Thomson in the first round Kenny Williams in the final round of the qualifying tournament. At the Pro Wrestling World Cup, he lost to the returning Joseph Conners in the first round.

WWE (2018–present)
On 16 May 2018 it was revealed that Coffey would be one of 16 men competing in a one-night tournament to face Pete Dunne for the WWE United Kingdom Championship. He would defeat Tucker and Dave Mastiff in the first and second round, respectively, before losing to Travis Banks in the semi-finals.

Coffey would then go on to be a mainstay of NXT UK, being accompanied by his brother Mark Coffey in a winning effort in the first ever televised match on NXT UK and later forming the stable Gallus with his brother and Wolfgang to feud with British Strong Style. Coffey main evented the inaugural NXT UK TakeOver in Blackpool on 12 January 2019 as he challenged Pete Dunne for the WWE United Kingdom Championship but failed to capture the title. After the match, he was attacked by the debuting Walter.

On the 8 May 2019 episode of NXT UK, Coffey qualified for a fatal-four-way match by defeating Flash Morgan Webster. After Dave Mastiff defeated Gallus' Wolfgang on the 15 May episode of NXT UK, Gallus attacked him. On the 5 June episode of NXT UK, Coffey failed to win the fatal-four match to get a title shot against WWE UK Champion Walter. Throughout the summer, Coffey began a feud with Mastiff. Gallus members Mark Coffey and Wolfgang also had a feud with the Hunt.

On the 10 July episode of NXT UK, Gallus defeated The Hunt & Dave Mastiff. On the 8 August episode of NXT, Coffey and Mastiff fought to a double count-out. After the match, Mastiff and Coffey attacked each other but got separated. During the match, Coffey had an injured ear. At NXT UK TakeOver: Cardiff, Coffey defeated Mastiff in a last man standing match to end the feud.

Coffey returned on the 3 October episode of NXT UK assisting Gallus in attacking Mark Andrews & Flash Morgan Webster. On the 24 October episode of NXT UK, Gallus interrupted Imperium by thanking them for taking out British Strong Style but said that NXT UK was their kingdom and they would insult WWE UK Champion Walter by calling him "Jolly Wolly". Gallus would gradually transition to faces. During Mark & Flash Morgan's match against Grizzled Young Veterans on the 7 November episode of NXT UK, Gallus and Imperium brawled with the two teams.

After Imperium's Alexander Wolfe tried to recruit Ilja Dragunov to Imperium, Dragunov aligned with Gallus during the brawl. After Alexander Wolfe defeated Ilja Dragunov on the 21 November episode of NXT UK, Gallus and Imperium again brawled. A week later on the 28 November episode, Gallus & Dragunov faced off against Imperium, but it ended in bedlam.

Coffey and Walter settled their negotiations on the 5 December episode of NXT UK which resulted in Coffey challenging Walter at NXT UK TakeOver: Blackpool II, Ilja Dragunov (although not part of Gallus) facing Alexander Wolfe in a no disqualification match at a future date (later revealed to be on the 2 January episode of NXT UK), and Gallus defending the NXT UK Tag Team Championships against Imperium's Marcel Barthel and Fabian Aichner on the 12 December episode which ended in a no-contest result. At NXT UK Takeover: Blackpool II, Coffey lost to Walter.

On 30 June 2020 Coffey was suspended by WWE following sexual misconduct allegations that were made public as part of the #SpeakingOut movement. He returned to WWE later in 2020.

On 23 August 2022, Coffey along with Gallus (Mark Coffey & Wolfgang) would debut on NXT facing current NXT UK Tag Team Champions Brooks Jensen and Josh Briggs, they would go on to win via countout.

Personal life 
Coffey is a supporter of Scottish football team Celtic F.C.

Championships and accomplishments 
Discovery Wrestling
Y Division Championship (1 time)
Insane Championship Wrestling
 ICW World Heavyweight Championship (2 times) 
 ICW Zero-G Championship (1 time)
 ICW "Iron Man" (2014, 2015)
 Wrestler of the Year Award (2014, 2016)
 Male Wrestler of the Bammy Year Award (2015)
 Square Go! (2017)
Pro Wrestling Elite
 Elite Rumble (2017)
 Pro Wrestling Illustrated
 Ranked No. 171 of the top 500 singles wrestlers in the PWI 500 in 2019
Scottish Wrestling Alliance
 Scottish Heavyweight Championship (2 times)
 SWA Laird of the Ring Championship (2 times)
 Battlezone Rumble (2014, 2015, 2016)
Target Wrestling
 Target Wrestling Championship (1 time)
World Wide Wrestling League
 W3L Tag Team Championship (1 time) - with Mark Coffey
WrestleZone
 WrestleZone Undisputed Championship (1 time)

References

External links

1988 births
21st-century professional wrestlers
Living people
Scottish male professional wrestlers
Sportspeople from Glasgow